Rasmus Wiedesheim-Paul (born 8 February 1999) is a Swedish footballer who plays as a striker for Rosenborg.

Career
Rasmus Widesheim-Paul joined Halmstad in 2013 as a 14 year old. He made his debut in July 2016 in a Superettan match against AFC Eskilstuna. In 2017, he was loaned out to Landskrona BoIS for four months. The following year, he was loaned out to IFK Värnamo for the second half of the seasons. In 2019, he became a regular for Halmstad and finished second on the top scorer list in 2019 Superettan with 18 goals. The following year, he signed for Rosenborg after scoring 13 goals in 18 matches in 2020 Superettan.

Personal life
He is the son of former Halmstad goalkeeper Håkan Svensson.

Career statistics

Club

References

External links
 Profile at RBK.no

1999 births
Living people
Swedish footballers
Rosenborg BK players
Eliteserien players
Association football forwards
Sweden youth international footballers
Sportspeople from Halmstad
Sportspeople from Halland County